The Youth of Maxim is a 1935 Soviet historical drama film directed by Grigori Kozintsev and Leonid Trauberg, the first part of trilogy about the life of a young factory worker named Maxim.

Plot
In 1910, a revolutionary underground group spreads leaflets featuring anti-tsarist slogans. Maksim, a young, happy-go-lucky worker and his comrades help the teacher Natasha, who is engaged in illegal activities in the factory, hide from the police.

Maksim's friend Andrei and another worker lose their lives. Their funeral turns into a huge demonstration which is suppressed by the police. Numerous people are arrested, among them Maksim, who subsequently becomes a Social Democratic activist.

Cast
 Boris Chirkov - Maksim
 Valentina Kibardina - Natasha
 Mikhail Tarkhanov - Polivanov
 Stepan Kayukov - Dmitri "Dyema" Savchenko
 Aleksandr Kulakov - Andrei
 Boris Blinov
 S. Leontyev	
 M. Shelkovsky
 Vladimir Sladkopevtsev
 Leonid Lyubashevky	
 Pavel Volkov - The workman with the accordion (uncredited)

References

External links
 
 Historical Dictionary of Russian and Soviet Cinema By Peter Rollberg

1935 films
Lenfilm films
Soviet black-and-white films
Films directed by Grigori Kozintsev
Films directed by Leonid Trauberg
Films scored by Dmitri Shostakovich
Articles containing video clips
Soviet historical drama films
1930s historical drama films
1935 drama films
Films set in the 1910s
1930s Russian-language films